The 1986–87 SM-liiga season was the 12th season of the SM-liiga, the top level of ice hockey in Finland. 10 teams participated in the league, and Tappara Tampere won the championship.

Standings

Playoffs

Semifinal
 Kärpät - HIFK 3:1 (3:2, 1:6, 8:4, 4:2)
 Tappara - TPS 3:1 (3:2, 1:6, 8:4, 4:2)

3rd place
 TPS - HIFK 1:5

Final
 Kärpät - Tappara 1:4 (3:5, 4:6, 5:1, 3:6, 2:5)

Relegation

External links
 SM-liiga official website

1986–87 in Finnish ice hockey
Fin
Liiga seasons